Gerardo Daniel Arteaga Zamora (born 7 September 1998) is a Mexican professional footballer who plays as a left-back for Belgian Pro League club Genk and the Mexico national team.

Club career

Santos Laguna
Arteaga joined Santos Laguna's youth academy in 2013. On 1 October 2016, under manager José Manuel de la Torre, he made his professional debut in Liga MX against Querétaro ending in a 1–1 draw.

Genk
On 26 July 2020, Santos Laguna announced the departure of Arteaga to Belgian club Genk for a reported fee of €3.5 million on a 5-year contract. Arteaga made his debut with the club on 24 August against Westerlo in a 2–2 draw.

On 25 April 2021, he played the entirety of the Belgian Cup final in a 2–1 victory over Standard Liège.

International career

Youth
Arteaga was included in the final roster that participated at the 2018 Toulon Tournament. He would go on to appear in all five matches, as Mexico would go to the final against England, where Mexico lost 2–1.

Arteaga was called up by Jaime Lozano to participate with the under-22 team at the 2019 Toulon Tournament, where Mexico won third place at the tournament.

Senior
In September 2018, he was called up by interim manager Ricardo Ferretti for September friendlies against Uruguay and the United States. Arteaga made his senior national team debut against the United States on 11 September 2018, where Mexico lost 0–1. On 27 September 2022, he scored his first international goal during a 2–3 loss against Colombia.

In October 2022, Arteaga was named in Mexico's preliminary 31-man squad for the 2022 FIFA World Cup, and in November, he was ultimately included in the final 26-man roster, but did not receive any minutes on the field during the tournament.

Career statistics

Club

International

Scores and results list Mexico's goal tally first, score column indicates score after each Arteaga goal.

Honours
Santos Laguna
Liga MX: Clausura 2018

Genk
Belgian Cup: 2020–21

References

External links

1998 births
Association football fullbacks
Belgian Pro League players
Expatriate footballers in Belgium
Footballers from Jalisco
Liga MX players
Liga Premier de México players
Living people
Mexican expatriate footballers
Mexican expatriate sportspeople in Belgium
Mexico international footballers
People from Zapopan, Jalisco
Santos Laguna footballers
2022 FIFA World Cup players
Mexican footballers